Bentil is a surname. Notable people with the surname include:

Ben Bentil (born 1995), Ghanaian basketball player
Emanuel Bentil (born 1978), Ghanaian footballer
Godwin Bentil (born 2001), Ghanaian footballer

Ghanaian surnames